Daniel Okyem Aboagye is a Ghanaian politician and member of the Seventh Parliament of the Fourth Republic of Ghana representing the Bantama Constituency in the Ashanti Region on the ticket of the New Patriotic Party.

Early life 
Okyem Aboagye was born in Atwima Boko in the Ashanti Region of Ghana.

Education 

Okyem Aboagye studied at the University of Ghana where he received a bachelor's degree in Business Administration. He graduated in 2002 with an MBA and MIS in Accounting from Troy University, Alabama, USA. Okyem Aboagye was certified in 2003 as a public accountant at the Certified Public Accountant of USA.

Career 

Okyem Aboagye started his career as the branch manager of SINAPI ABA TRUST in 1998. He later became the project manager of Opportunity International in 2003–2006. Okyem Aboagye was the financial controller of Globe Union in the US and CEO of MGI Microfinance in 2008–2012.

Politics 
In 2015 he contested and won the NPP parliamentary primaries for Bantama (Ghana parliament constituency) in the Ashanti Region of Ghana. He won this parliamentary seat during the 2016 Ghanaian general elections. In June 2020, he lost the bid to represent the New Patriotic Party after losing in the primaries to Francis Asenso-Boakye, who would later become the member of parliament for the Bantama (Ghana parliament constituency).

Personal life 
Okyem Aboagye is married.

References

Ghanaian MPs 2017–2021
New Patriotic Party politicians
Living people
1972 births